Power Distribution Services Ghana  formerly Electricity Company of Ghana is an electricity distribution company in Ghana. The company's operation covers about thirty percent of the total land mass of the country. Formerly as a public company, its operations were under the Ministry of Energy of Ghana. Together with Northern Electricity Distribution Company, they supply all of Ghana's electricity demands as well as some other West African countries. PDS took over ECG on 1 March 2019.

The company has initiated many periods of load shedding which have increased in recent times and gained traction in popular culture under the term dumsor.

See also

 Electricity sector in Ghana

References

Electric power companies of Ghana
Government of Ghana